Andrzej Michalak (7 April 1959) is a Polish former cyclist. He competed in the 1000m time trial and team pursuit events at the 1980 Summer Olympics.

References

External links
 

1959 births
Living people
Polish male cyclists
Olympic cyclists of Poland
Cyclists at the 1980 Summer Olympics
People from Radom
Sportspeople from Masovian Voivodeship
20th-century Polish people